"Hey, Hey, Rise Up!" It is based on a 1914 Ukrainian anthem, "Oh, the Red Viburnum in the Meadow", and features vocals in Ukrainian by Andriy Khlyvnyuk of the Ukrainian band BoomBox.

"Hey, Hey, Rise Up!" is the first entirely new piece of music recorded by Pink Floyd since "Louder than Words" in 2014. The guitarist, David Gilmour, was inspired to record it in support of Ukraine during the 2022 Russian invasion. Pink Floyd also released a music video, directed by Mat Whitecross, with images of life struggling amidst warfare. The single was released on CD and vinyl on 15 July 2022, alongside a new version of Pink Floyd's 1994 song "A Great Day for Freedom". All proceeds go to the Ukraine Humanitarian Relief Fund.

Background

In February 2022, the Ukrainian singer Andriy Khlyvnyuk, who had abandoned a US tour by his band BoomBox to serve in the Ukrainian military in response to the Russian invasion of Ukraine on 24 February, recorded an a capella version of the first verse of the Ukrainian anthem "Oh, the Red Viburnum in the Meadow". The anthem was written by Stepan Charnetskii in 1914 to commemorate the Sich Riflemen. Khlyvnyuk, wearing fatigues and carrying an automatic rifle, videoed his performance in Sophia Square in Kyiv, with the Bell Tower of Saint Sophia Cathedral in the background, and posted it on Instagram on 27 February.

The Pink Floyd guitarist, David Gilmour, was shown the Instagram post by the Ukrainian artist Janina Pedan, who is married to his son Charlie, and was inspired to record something in support of Ukraine in the ongoing Russo-Ukrainian War. He contacted Pink Floyd drummer Nick Mason and suggested they collaborate. Pink Floyd had been inactive for several years, and Gilmour had said several times that the band would not reunite; however, the war encouraged him to release the track as Pink Floyd as it was a "big platform" and it was "vitally" important to raise awareness about the war. He said: "It's a really difficult and frustrating thing to see this extraordinarily crazy, unjust attack by a major power on an independent, peaceful, democratic nation."

Khlyvnyuk, while recovering in hospital from a shrapnel wound sustained in defence of Ukraine, gave Gilmour his blessing to use his vocals. Gilmour wrote extra music, including a guitar solo. Gilmour had previously been backed by BoomBox—without Khlyvnyuk—in 2015, at Koko, London, in support of the Belarus Free Theatre.

Pink Floyd had already removed music from streaming services in Russia and Belarus. Their work with Roger Waters remained, leading to speculation that Waters had blocked its removal; Gilmour said only that "I was disappointed ... Read into that what you will." Gilmour said the song was a "one-off for charity" and that Pink Floyd had no plans to reform.

Recording 

"Hey, Hey, Rise Up!" was recorded on 30 March 2022 at Gilmour's home by Gilmour and Mason with Guy Pratt, bassist with Pink Floyd since 1987, and keyboardist Nitin Sawhney. It was Sawhney's first work with Pink Floyd. Gala Wright, Pratt's wife and also the daughter of late Pink Floyd keyboardist and founding member Richard Wright, was also present during the recording.

The song—whose title comes from the last line of "Oh, the Red Viburnum in the Meadow", which some translations give as "Hey, hey, rise up and rejoice"—opens with a sample from another recording of Charnetskii's anthem, by the Veryovka Ukrainian Folk Choir.

Music video 

The music video was directed by Mat Whitecross, also on 30 March, on a set designed by Pedan. In the video, the band play while Khlyvnyuk's Sophia Square video is projected behind them. The performance is intercut with scenes of war damage, survivors and refugees in Ukraine. Mason's drums are decorated with reproductions of a painting by Maria Primachenko, a Ukrainian artist, several of whose works were destroyed in a fire caused by Russian shelling during the invasion.

Cover art 

The single's artwork depicts a band logotype (in the style of Gerald Scarfe's lettering for The Wall patterned after the Ukrainian flag alongside a sunflower, the national flower of Ukraine, in a 2019 painting by Cuban artist Yosan Leon. The choice of flower also references a remark from a Ukrainian woman who was seen handing sunflower seeds to Russian soldiers in the early days of the invasion, telling them to carry the seeds in their pockets so that sunflowers will grow from their dead bodies.

Release

"Hey, Hey, Rise Up!" was released on digital platforms and streaming services on 8 April 2022. It was Pink Floyd's first newly recorded material since the 2014 song "Louder Than Words". A physical version of the single on both CD and vinyl was released on 15 July 2022, which included a newly reworked version of "A Great Day for Freedom" as a b-side. Proceeds from "Hey, Hey, Rise Up!" go to the Ukraine Humanitarian Relief Fund.

Response 
The journalist Mark Savage of BBC News praised the song, saying that it was "built around a spine-tingling refrain" by Khlyvnyuk. Khlyvnyuk said the song was "fabulous" and thanked Pink Floyd for their efforts. Some fans felt that it was improper for the group to release music as Pink Floyd without the keyboardist Richard Wright, who died in 2008, or the bassist and songwriter Roger Waters, who left in 1985. The Classic Rock journalist Fraser Lewry disagreed, writing: "When thousands have been killed and millions have fled their homes, moaning about the absence of a band member [Waters] who left 37 years ago is churlish at best. At worst, it's contemptuous of the suffering."

Waters was critical of the song, saying it "lacked humanity" and constituted a "content-less waving of the blue and yellow flag" rather than an explicit call for the war to end. He said Russia's invasion of Ukraine was "probably the most provoked invasion ever" and refused to "see Russia from the current Russo-phobic perspective".

Commercial performance

Based on downloads and sales in its first two days, the single appeared on the midweek UK Singles Chart at number 5. It debuted at number 49 on the final chart.

Personnel
Pink Floyd
David Gilmour – guitar, production
Nick Mason – drums

with
Andriy Khlyvnyuk – vocals
Guy Pratt – bass guitar
Nitin Sawhney – keyboards
Veryovka Ukrainian Folk Choir – choir

Charts

Weekly charts

Year-end charts

See also

2022 in music
Pink Floyd discography
Music of Ukraine

References

External links

Songs about the 2022 Russian invasion of Ukraine
2022 singles
2022 songs
Pink Floyd songs
Song recordings produced by David Gilmour
Songs written by David Gilmour
Works based on songs
Rhino Entertainment singles
Columbia Records singles
Sony Music singles